Love Like Poison is a 2010 French coming-of-age drama film directed by Katell Quillévéré and starring Clara Augarde, Lio and Michel Galabru. The film's title is taken from the song "Un poison violent, c'est ça l'amour" by Serge Gainsbourg. It was screened in the Directors' Fortnight section of the 2010 Cannes Film Festival. It won the Prix Jean Vigo in 2010.

Plot
Anna is a 14-year-old spending the summer holidays with her mother in her grandfather's family home in Brittany. The grandfather is old and confined to his bedroom. Her mother meanwhile is having crisis with her married life and is on the verge of moving back with her parents. Anna and her mother are religious. Anna is upset by the separation of her parents and gets close with male figures. A local teenage boy is attracted with her and she reciprocates the attention. Despite her shame of her body she finds confidence in exploring her sexuality. She begins to show fainting spells at gatherings. She is anxious about her confirmation and confides it with the priest, who is her mother past lover. She is torn between her unsympathetic world in front of her and faith, but she finds happiness by embracing her teenage emotions and asks out the local boy whom she have spent time.

Cast 
 Clara Augarde as Anna Falguères 
 Lio as Jeanne Falguères 
 Michel Galabru as Jean Falguères 
 Stefano Cassetti as Father François 
 Thierry Neuvic as Paul Falguères  
 Youen Leboulanger-Gourvil as Pierre 
 Philippe Duclos as The Bishop

Production
Clara Augarde, who was 14 year old during filming, agreed to have topless scenes, but she refused to play the one where her character lifts her nightgown to show her genitals (An older body double replaced her).

Reception
, the film holds a 93% approval rating on the review aggregator website Rotten Tomatoes, based on 14 reviews with an average rating 7.89/10.

References

External links 
 

2010 films
2010s coming-of-age drama films
2010s French-language films
French coming-of-age drama films
Films about religion
Films directed by Katell Quillévéré
2010 directorial debut films
2010 drama films
2010s French films